Calvas is a canton of the Province of Loja, Ecuador, located in the south of the province, bordering Paltas and Gonzanamá in the north, Quilanga and Espíndola in the east, Peru in the south, and Sozoranga in the west.  It covers 1700 km2 at an altitude of about 1932m.  Total population is about 31,000, and the capital city of the canton is Cariamanga.

Demographics
Ethnic groups as of the Ecuadorian census of 2010:
Mestizo  95.9%
White  2.2%
Afro-Ecuadorian  1.2%
Indigenous  0.4%
Montubio  0.3%
Other  0.1%

Attractions
 Ahuaca Hill - 2463m tall, it is made up of two peaks.  A cross is placed at 2454m as a symbol of local faith.

References

Cantons of Loja Province